Gorham High School may refer to a school in the United States:

Gorham High School (Maine)
Gorham High School (New Hampshire)